The Men's 100 kg competition in judo at the 2020 Summer Olympics in Tokyo will be held on 29 July 2021 at the Nippon Budokan.

Results

Finals

Repechage

Pool A

Pool B

Pool C

Pool D

Notes

References

External links
 
 Draw 

M100
Judo at the Summer Olympics Men's Half Heavyweight
Men's events at the 2020 Summer Olympics